Hermann Glück (born 21 December 1903, date of death unknown) was an Austrian weightlifter. He competed in the men's light-heavyweight event at the 1924 Summer Olympics.

References

External links
 

1903 births
Year of death missing
Austrian male weightlifters
Olympic weightlifters of Austria
Weightlifters at the 1924 Summer Olympics
Place of birth missing
20th-century Austrian people